Axel Juárez (born 27 July 1990) is an Argentine footballer who plays for Paraguayan side 12 de Octubre as a midfielder. He made his senior debut in Primera División for San Lorenzo on May 18, 2009, when he came on as a substitute in the first half against Gimnasia Jujuy.

References

1990 births
Living people
Argentine footballers
Argentine expatriate footballers
Association football midfielders
Sportspeople from Buenos Aires Province
San Lorenzo de Almagro footballers
Independiente Rivadavia footballers
C.F. Mérida footballers
Defensa y Justicia footballers
Nueva Chicago footballers
Apollon Smyrnis F.C. players
Guillermo Brown de Puerto Madryn footballers
12 de Octubre Football Club players
Argentine Primera División players
Paraguayan Primera División players
Super League Greece players
Argentine expatriate sportspeople in Greece
Argentine expatriate sportspeople in Paraguay
Expatriate footballers in Greece
Expatriate footballers in Paraguay